Senator Carter may refer to:

Benjamin F. Carter (1824–1916), Wisconsin State Senate
Bobby Carter (1939–2015), Tennessee State Senate
Buddy Carter (born 1957), Georgia State Senate
Cecil K. Carter Jr. (1929–1987), Louisiana State Senate
Charles B. Carter (1880–1927), Maine State Senate 
Charles Newell Carter (born 1967), North Carolina State Senate
Curry Carter (1892–1970), Virginia State Senate
Galen A. Carter (1832–1893), Connecticut State Senate
Heather Carter (fl. 2010s–2020s), Arizona State Senate
Hugh Carter (1920–1999), Georgia State Senate
Jason Carter (politician) (born 1975), Georgia State Senate
Jesse W. Carter (1888–1959), California State Senate
Jill P. Carter (born 1964), Maryland State Senate
Jimmy Carter (born 1924), Georgia State Senate
John A. Carter (Virginia politician) (1808–1895), Virginia State Senate
Margaret Carter (born 1935), Oregon State Senate
Oliver Jesse Carter (1911–1976), California State Senate
Raymond Carter (Missouri politician) (1905–1968), Missouri State Senate
Stuart B. Carter (1907–1983), Virginia State Senate
Thomas H. Carter (1854–1911), U.S. Senator from Montana
Timothy J. Carter (1800–1838), Maine State Senate
Troy Carter (politician) (born 1963), Louisiana State Senate
William Blount Carter (1792–1848), Tennessee State Senate
William Grayson Carter (died 1849), Kentucky State Senate